La Mujer y el jockey (Hipódromo) is a 1939 Argentine romantic comedy film directed by José Suárez and written by Antonio Botta. The film premiered in Buenos Aires on December 21, 1939.

Cast
Alicia Barrié
Antonio Capuano
Dringue Farías
 Severo Fernández
Dorita Ferreyro
Vicente Forastieri
Lalo Malcolm
César Mariño
Elvira Quiroga

External links 
 

1939 films
1930s Spanish-language films
Argentine black-and-white films
1939 romantic comedy films
Films directed by José Suárez
Argentine romantic comedy films
1930s Argentine films